Écuyer or Ecuyer is a French surname. Notable people with the surname include:

Al Ecuyer (1937–2012), American football player
Édouard Écuyer de le Court (1901–1951), Belgian Olympic modern pentathlete
Émile Écuyer (1881–1952), French discus thrower

See also
Lecuyer

French-language surnames